Ivan and Matej Sabanov were the defending champions but chose not to defend their title.

Robin Haase and Sem Verbeek won the title after defeating Fabian Fallert and Hendrik Jebens 6–2, 5–7, [10–3] in the final.

Seeds

Draw

References

External links
 Main draw

Platzmann-Sauerland Open - Doubles